Galin Qayah (also Romanized as Galīn Qayah and Galīn Qayeh; also known as Galin Qaya) is a village in Harzandat-e Gharbi Rural District of the Central District of Marand County, East Azerbaijan province, Iran. At the 2006 National Census, its population was 2,461 in 655 households. The following census in 2011 counted 2,326 people in 721 households. The latest census in 2016 showed a population of 1,990 people in 682 households; it was the largest village in its rural district. The people of Galin Qayah speak the Harzandi dialect of the Tati language.

References 

Marand County

Populated places in East Azerbaijan Province

Populated places in Marand County